Mohamed Sadik Coubageat (born November 14, 1982 in Lomé) is a Togolese football midfielder, who plays for [  AL ITTIHAD 07 - 08 and Khaleej Sirte in the Libyan Premier League.

1982 births
Living people
Togolese footballers
Togo international footballers
FC Grenchen players
Togolese expatriate footballers
Expatriate footballers in Libya
Association football midfielders
SC Young Fellows Juventus players
Togolese expatriate sportspeople in Libya
21st-century Togolese people